Chitra Shukla is an Indian actress who works predominantly in Telugu films.

Career 
She made her debut with Maa Abbayi opposite Sree Vishnu, which marked her Telugu lead debut. Chitra was signed for Maa Abbayi when the makers of the film noticed her in a song from Nenu Sailaja (2016). She went on to work with Raj Tarun in Rangula Ratnam and Allari Naresh in Silly Fellows. Her upcoming films include Kaadal, a love story set in 2004, and Naa Naa a Tamil film starring Sasikumar.

Filmography

References

External links 

Living people
Indian film actresses
Actresses in Telugu cinema
Actresses in Tamil cinema
1996 births